The Assistant Secretary for Housing, who also carries the title Federal Housing Commissioner, is a position within the United States Department of Housing and Urban Development. The Assistant Secretary is responsible for overseeing the $400 billions  Federal Housing Administration insurance portfolio. He or she also oversees the Department of Housing and Urban Development's regulatory responsibilities in the areas of the Real Estate Settlement Procedures Act, the housing mission of Fannie Mae and Freddie Mac, and the manufactured housing industry.

Role
The Federal Housing Commissioner is appointed by the President and confirmed by the United States Senate. The Assistant Secretary is third in the order of succession for the office of Secretary of Housing and Urban Development. The Assistant Secretary is paid at level IV of the Executive Schedule, meaning he or she receives a basic annual salary of $143,000. The position is currently vacant.

Assistant Secretaries of Housing and Urban Development for Housing
At the founding of the Department of Housing and Urban Development in 1965, one Assistant Secretary role was specifically designated to perform the functions of the existing role of Federal Housing Commissioner. HUD Secretary George W. Romney split the role between two new titles, Assistant Secretary for Housing Production and Mortgage Credit (HPMC, for the production side of Sections 235 and 236 and public housing), combining the GHA Commissioner role, and a separate Assistant Secretary for Housing Management (HM). Finally, on June 16, 1976, HUD Secretary Carla Hills merged the two roles into one single Assistant Secretary for Housing & Federal Housing Commissioner role, which remains the title today.

Assistant Secretary – Federal Housing Commissioner

†Incumbent FHA Commissioner at founding of Department of Housing and Urban Development

Assistant Secretary of Housing Production and Mortgage Credit – Federal Housing Commissioner

Assistant Secretary of Housing Management

Assistant Secretary of Housing – Federal Housing Commissioner

Previous Federal Housing Commissioners include Carol Galante, who served as Acting Federal Housing Commissioner from July 2011 until she was confirmed by the Senate in December 2012. She served as Federal Housing Commissioner until October 2014, when she stepped down to take a faculty position at the University of California at Berkeley. Before her, Brian D. Montgomery, who was confirmed in February 2005 served as Federal Housing Commissioner. The previous Federal Housing Commissioner was John C. Weicher.

References

United States Assistant Secretaries of Housing and Urban Development